Synaptula is a genus of sea cucumbers, in the family Synaptidae. 

This genus contains many species, most of them whitish, often associated with sponges. However, they are extremely difficult to identify from sight, and many tropical Indo-Pacific are referred to as Synaptula lamperti, which is often the only species named by touristic guides.

List of species 
The genus contains the following species:

Synaptula alba Heding, 1928
Synaptula albolineata Heding, 1928
Synaptula ater Heding, 1928
Synaptula bandae Heding, 1928
Synaptula denticulata Heding, 1928
Synaptula hydriformis (Lesueur, 1824)
Synaptula indivisa (Semper, 1867)
Synaptula jolensis Heding, 1928
Synaptula lactea (Sluiter, 1887)
Synaptula lamperti Heding, 1928
Synaptula macra (H. L. Clark, 1938)
Synaptula maculata (Sluiter, 1887)
Synaptula madreporica Heding, 1928
Synaptula media Cherbonnier & Féral, 1984
Synaptula minima Heding, 1928
Synaptula mortensenii Heding, 1929
Synaptula neirensis Heding, 1928
Synaptula psara (Sluiter, 1887)
Synaptula reciprocans (Forskal, 1775)
Synaptula recta (Semper, 1867)
Synaptula reticulata (Semper, 1867)
Synaptula rosea Heding, 1928
Synaptula rosetta Heding, 1928
Synaptula secreta Ancona Lopez, 1957
Synaptula spinifera Massin & Tomascik, 1996
Synaptula tualensis Heding, 1928
Synaptula varians (Nair, 1946)
Synaptula violacea Heding, 1928
Synaptula virgata (Sluiter, 1901)

References

Holothuroidea genera
Synaptidae